Damage Control is the debut studio album by British electronic music producer Mat Zo. It peaked at number 1 on the US Billboard Top Heatseekers chart, and number 7 on the US Billboard Dance/Electronic Albums chart. The album was nominated for a Grammy Award for Best Dance/Electronic Album in 2013.

Track listing

References

2013 debut albums
Mat Zo albums
Anjunabeats albums
Astralwerks albums